Brachylia eutelia is a moth in the family Cossidae. It is found in Namibia.

References

Natural History Museum Lepidoptera generic names catalog

Endemic fauna of Namibia
Cossinae
Moths described in 1959
Moths of Africa